Gdje je srce tu je dom is the second studio album by Croatian singer-songwriter Antonija Šola, which was released in December 2008, by Dallas Records. The album was named after her hit from Dora 2008, where Šola had the most votes from the audience and almost represented Croatia at the Eurovision Song Contest 2008.

The album left a great commercial success and sold more than 15,000 copies, and Šola achieved a gold certification for the album.

Track listing 
Gdje Je Srce Tu Je Dom 
Milijun Poljubaca - Remix
Zvijezdo
Bitanga i Princeza
Uzmi Mi Sve
Kažeš Zbogom
Ko Lane Ranjena
Prevelika Kazna
Veruvaj/Vjeruj
Slučajni Partneri
Usne Na Usne
Priča Za Laku Noć
XXX (Vrati Mi Se)
Mrva Jubavi
Kade Što E Srceto E Mojot Dom (Macedonian version of "Gdje Je Srce Tu Je Dom)

References

External links 

2008 albums
Croatian-language albums